Davao de Oro's 1st congressional district is a congressional district for the House of Representatives of the Philippines in the province of Davao de Oro. It was created ahead of the 1998 Philippine House of Representatives elections by the same republic act of July 19, 1997 that established the province initially named Compostela Valley. The district encompasses most of the area of its namesake valley in the Mindanao Pacific Cordillera which were formerly within Davao del Norte's 1st district. It currently comprises the municipalities of Compostela, Maragusan, Monkayo, Montevista and New Bataan. Maricar Zamora of the Hugpong ng Pagbabago (HNP) currently serves as this district's representative in the 19th Congress, the first under the province's new name of Davao de Oro.

Representation history

Election results

2022

2019

2016

See also
Legislative districts of Davao de Oro

References

Congressional districts of the Philippines
Politics of Davao de Oro
1998 establishments in the Philippines
Congressional districts of the Davao Region
Constituencies established in 1998